Lau Tim (born 1 January 1934) is a Taiwanese former  footballer. He competed in the men's tournament at the 1960 Summer Olympics.

Honours

Republic of China
Asian Games Gold medal: 1958

References

External links
 
 

1934 births
Living people
Taiwanese footballers
Chinese Taipei international footballers from Hong Kong
Olympic footballers of Taiwan
Footballers at the 1960 Summer Olympics
1960 AFC Asian Cup players
Association football midfielders
Asian Games medalists in football
Asian Games gold medalists for Chinese Taipei
Footballers at the 1958 Asian Games
Medalists at the 1958 Asian Games
Kitchee SC players